Erika Hendsel (born 7 November 1997) is a retired Estonian tennis player.

On 7 October 2013, Hendsel reached her best singles ranking of World No. 1101.

Playing for Estonia at the Fed Cup, Hendsel has a win–loss record of 0–2.

References

External links 
 
 
 

1997 births
Living people
Sportspeople from Tallinn
Estonian female tennis players